Villa del Dique is located  in the southeast direction from Córdoba, Argentina, on the Ruta Provincial RP 51 at an altitude of .  In 2001 it had 2,829 inhabitants. The area has been used as a special stage in the 2014 Rally Argentina.

References

Córdoba, Argentina
Populated places in Córdoba Province, Argentina
Rally Argentina